Feisoglio is a comune (municipality) in the Province of Cuneo in the Italian region Piedmont, located about  southeast of Turin and about  northeast of Cuneo.

Feisoglio borders the following municipalities: Bossolasco, Cerreto Langhe, Cravanzana, Gorzegno, Levice, Niella Belbo, Serravalle Langhe, and Torre Bormida.

References

Cities and towns in Piedmont